Erica Elisabeth Arendt Harvor is a Canadian novelist and poet who lives in Ottawa, Ontario. She was born in Saint John, New Brunswick, where she grew up on the Kingston Peninsula. She enrolled at Concordia University in 1983, receiving an MA in Creative Writing in 1986. She has also won many awards for her fiction and poetry. Her short story collection Let Me Be the One was a finalist for the 1996 Governor General's Literary Award. Fortress of Chairs, her first book of poems, won the Gerald Lampert Memorial Award for best first book of poetry written by a Canadian writer in 1992. Her second poetry book, The Long Cold Green Evenings of Spring, was a finalist for the Lowther Award in 1997, and her first novel, Excessive Joy Injures the Heart, was chosen one of the ten best books of the year by The Toronto Star in 2000.  Also in 2000 Harvor won the Alden Nowlan Award, in 2003 the Marian Engel Award, and in 2004 the Malahat Novella Prize for "Across Some Dark Avenue of Plot He Carried Her Body." She won second prize in Prairie Fire's Fiction category for "An Animal Trainer Urging A Big Cat Out of its Cage in 2015.


Bibliography

Short stories
Women and Children (1973, revised as Our Lady of All Distances, 1991)
If Only We Could Drive Like This Forever (1988)
Let Me Be the One (1996, nominated for a Governor General's Award)

Poetry
Fortress of Chairs (1992, winner of the Gerald Lampert Award)
The Long Cold Green Evenings of Spring (1997)
An Open Door in the Landscape (2010)

Novels
Excessive Joy Injures the Heart (McClelland & Stewart (Canada) Harcourt (US), 2000) 
All Times Have Been Modern (Penguin, 2004)

Anthologies
A Room at the Heart of Things (1998)

External links
Elizabeth Harvor at Canadian Poetry Online

1936 births
Living people
21st-century Canadian novelists
20th-century Canadian poets
21st-century Canadian poets
20th-century Canadian women writers
21st-century Canadian women writers
Canadian women poets
Canadian women short story writers
Canadian women novelists
Writers from Ottawa
Writers from Saint John, New Brunswick
Concordia University alumni
20th-century Canadian short story writers
21st-century Canadian short story writers